Rob Smith (born 21 May 1992) is a British racing driver currently competing in the British Touring Car Championship. He debuted in 2019 after spending the previous season in the Mini Challenge UK.

Racing record

Complete British Touring Car Championship results

(key) Races in bold indicate pole position (1 point awarded – 2002–2003 all races, 2004–present just in first race) Races in italics indicate fastest lap (1 point awarded all races) * signifies that driver lead race for at least one lap (1 point awarded – 2002 just in feature races, 2003–present all races)

References

External links
 http://www.robsmithmotorsport.com/

1992 births
Living people
British Touring Car Championship drivers
English racing drivers
British racing drivers
Renault UK Clio Cup drivers
Mini Challenge UK drivers